Swindon Stadium, also known as the Abbey Stadium, is a Greyhound Board of Great Britain regulated greyhound racing track and former speedway track in Blunsdon, Swindon, England. Greyhound racing currently takes place every Monday, Wednesday, Friday and Sunday as part of the ARC fixture schedule.

Speedway

The stadium was home to the Swindon Robins, who competed in the SGB Premiership until 2021. The speedway track has a circumference of 315 metres.

Opening 
The stadium opened to the public on 23 July 1949 when it hosted the Swindon Robins speedway team; greyhound racing followed three years later on 1 November 1952. Swindon had two earlier short-lived greyhound track venues, in the village of Wroughton and near the town centre in Edinburgh Street, but both had disappeared by the mid-thirties. The stadium occupied a rural setting south of Lady Lane and was named after the Blunsdon Abbey estate in Blunsdon St Andrew, a Victorian estate which had seen its main house destroyed by fire in 1904.

History 

The track initially raced as an independent, with 2,000 people attending on 1 November 1952 to watch a greyhound called Don't Care win a 324-yard race in a time of 19.02 secs at odds of 6–1.  The stadium came into the hands of the Bristol Greyhound Racing Association, owners of Oxford and Eastville (Bristol) stadiums at that time. This led to the track becoming part of the National Greyhound Racing Club during April 1968. The Silver Plume competition arrived in the same year, as the track's principal event. Another independent track to the northwest of Swindon opened during the sixties at Common Platt but had little effect on the business of its larger neighbour.

In 1983 ADT (British Car Auctions) purchased the Abbey Stadium and used its large car park as a base for their sales. Other competitions at the track were the Grand National of the West, Pride of the West and the Jubilee Stakes. In 1997 the BS Group sold their Eastville stadium and bought Swindon from ADT. The entire Bristol operation including the racing office, bookmakers, trainers, the Western Two Year Old Produce Stakes and the BAGS contract transferred to Swindon.

The BS Group became Stadia UK and then Gaming International, and after the closure of Walthamstow stadium in 2008 the track hosted the Arc competition. In 2018 the stadium signed a deal with ARC to race a Monday, Wednesday and Friday matinée meeting every week. Later in 2018, the Arc competition was discontinued due to expected track changes, but following the sudden closure of Towcester, leading owner John Turner stepped in to save the Oaks with a late scheduling in December.

Redevelopment
A redevelopment has been planned since June 2007. The owners, Gaming International, were granted outline planning permission in 2008 to build houses on part of the site and after several revisions, outline permission was again granted in 2015, for up to 100 houses and a care home. Work began on housing in November 2016 but the stadium plans were delayed. In 2019, the original plans to reposition the stadium and track were scrapped, and the track was reduced in circumference from 463 metres by creating two new bends inside the old circumference, making way for housing. The 509 race distance was also scrapped. The planning authority disallowed any further housing additions until progress was made with replacing the existing buildings. 

The stadium and track, therefore, remained in its original position with plans to install prefabricated buildings in place of the existing buildings. From 2021 to 2023, the speedway team did not enter the British leagues due to uncertainty surrounding the ongoing changes. In December 2022, the stadium continued to experience a stand off between the council and builders Taylor Wimpey over perimeters and expected redevelopment. Clarke Osborne of Gaming International issued a press release for a call for sites, which states that it wants to find ground for a 5,000 capacity stadium to host speedway, karting and car racing. However similar statements had been issued in previous years by Gaming International/BS Group for Milton Keynes Greyhound Stadium, Reading Stadium and Eastville Stadium.

Competitions

Current

British Bred Produce

Former

The Arc

The Oaks

Silver Plume

1968–1974: 550 yards, 1975–1998: 480 metres

Current track records

Former track records

Former track records (post-metric)

Former track records (pre-metric)

References 

Sports venues in Swindon
Greyhound racing venues in the United Kingdom
Defunct speedway venues in England